The Upper Hudson River Railroad was a heritage railroad that operated from 1999 to 2010 in the upper Hudson River in New York State's Adirondack Mountains.

Primary motive power consisted of Southwind Rail Travel Limited ex-Delaware & Hudson locomotive No. 5019.

History

The Upper Hudson River Railroad uses the Adirondack Railway line built by Thomas C. Durant in 1871 to North Creek. North Creek station is where Theodore Roosevelt learned he was to become president of the United States of America after President William McKinley was assassinated in 1901.

During World War II, magnetite, ilmenite, and titanium were shipped by rail from Tahawus by the Delaware and Hudson Railway (D&H). The D&H, which acquired the Adirondack Line from William West Durant in 1889, ran through this region until 1989 when the mine at Tahawus closed. The D&H last operated Monday through Saturday scheduled passenger service in the 1950s; reduced to summer service by the mid-1950s. Regular service having entirely ended by 1957, with only freight service remaining.

In 1998 the right of way was purchased by Warren County with plans to operate an excursion train to improve tourism and economic development in the area.

The 2007 season included excursions to  Ranch, the 40 miler to Hadley, and a Payroll Robbery. Various actors playing the roles of clowns, hobos, and a musician/storyteller join the excursions.

End of operations
The Upper Hudson River Railroad lost their contract with Warren County on December 31, 2010. On April 8, 2011, it was announced that Iowa Pacific Holdings would take over operation of the route effective July 1, 2011. As part of the agreement, the Iowa Pacific agreed to operate a minimum of 182 tourist-oriented passenger trains over the line. Iowa Pacific began operating trains on July 12, 2011 as the Saratoga and North Creek Railroad. Unlike the Upper Hudson River Railroad, the Saratoga and North Creek operates over the entire  distance between the Upper Hudson River Railroad's former terminal in North Creek and the station in Saratoga Springs, which allows connections with Amtrak's Adirondack and Ethan Allen Express services.

An article dated May 14, 2012 in the Post Star titled Federal board OKs rail freight line between North Creek and Newcomb stated, "The operator of the Saratoga & North Creek Railway can move forward with plans to reopen the Tahawus rail line between North Creek and Newcomb and offer freight service, U.S. Sen. Charles Schumer, D-N.Y., announced Monday. The federal Surface Transportation Board on Monday approved a request for 'common carrier' status on the line, which allows Iowa Pacific Holdings, the rail line operator, to reopen the line." This action will result in freight traffic running over the former UHRR line.

Stations
North Creek – North Creek, New York
Riverside Station – Riparius, New York (NRHP)

References

External links

 Upper Hudson River Railroad

Heritage railroads in New York (state)
Hudson River
Tourist attractions in Warren County, New York
Defunct New York (state) railroads
Railway companies established in 1999
Railway companies disestablished in 2010
1999 establishments in New York (state)